Kadie Karen Diekmeyer (born September 24, 1964), popularly known as That Vegan Teacher, is a Canadian animal rights activist, former educator, and singer-songwriter mainly known for promoting veganism. Before she started her online career, Diekmeyer was a nurse and later an ESL teacher but eventually left the latter job at the start of the COVID-19 pandemic. Diekmeyer is known for her TikTok and YouTube accounts that promote veganism. Diekmeyer's content has been controversial, including accusations of racism and homophobia.

Early life 

Diekmeyer was born on September 24, 1964, in Montreal, and is of German and Swiss descent. Diekmeyer worked as a registered nurse at the Lakeshore General Hospital for 25 years, and attended Concordia University to become an ESL teacher in French Canadian schools for nine years. She worked both jobs before dropping her nursing career to work full time in the school system and eventually leaving her job at the start of the COVID-19 pandemic.

Career 
In 1995 Diekmeyer composed the nationalistic English-French folk song "Imaginez un Pays/Imagine a Country" for performing at the Unity Rally at the Place du Canada. She spoke of her anxiety before her public performance, which she had never done before, and got help from her friends and relatives to write the French lyrics. Cheryl Cornacchia of the Montreal Gazette called her one of "the dozens of do-it-yourself artists making a place for themselves in Montreal". As of 1999, Diekmeyer had written 47 songs, mainly about life and women's empowerment.

Diekmeyer is known for her TikTok and YouTube career of promoting veganism. She went viral on TikTok for a song, "Eating Animals is Wrong, McDonald's", in July 2020. Some of Diekmeyer's content has been characterized as racist and homophobic, including repurposing the slogan of "I can't breathe" for a song about the process of killing animals, as well as arguing that coming out as LGBT is a selfish act as opposed to doing so as vegan. Diekmeyer has drawn criticism for comparing the animal agriculture industry to the Holocaust. In September 2020, she was criticized for saying she would no longer sign her organ donor card, "not [wanting] to donate [her] organs to meat eaters after [she] dies".

In March 2021, she made a YouTube video, titled "Are You Racist?", in which she spelled out the word "nigger" and encouraged people to ban cruelty instead of words. Another controversy arose in result of Diekmeyer's comment on a 2021 TikTok video by gaming YouTuber TommyInnit, where he talked about his YouTube Play Button. Using TikTok's stitch function, she responded, "Tommy! The nice vegan girls don't want to see your buttons, but if you want them to play with your buttons, you're going to have to show them your fruits and your vegetables," while taking out a cucumber, pear, and apple. This sexual joke enraged people online, owing to TommyInnit's age, then 16. Diekmeyer defended herself, claiming she "had no idea who he was," and that [at his age], he was considered a "college-age student" in Canada. Later that year, she was IP banned from TikTok for breaching community guidelines, though the exact cause was unknown. Diekmeyer posted a video on her YouTube page, promising to not give up on her platform. She has made more TikTok accounts but ended up with most of them being banned.

Personal life and views 
Diekmeyer is bisexual.

Diekmeyer speaks English and French. A vegan since June 27, 2016, she condemns what she considers to be vegaphobia. Her open letter, "Dog persuaded them to give up meat", censuring cruelty to animals, was published in the Montreal Gazette in 2004. She has  three children with her first husband. She re-married on December 4, 2021, following a courtship of nine and a half years.

Diekmeyer has also voiced her views on circumcision, calling it child abuse.

See also 

 Animal rights
 Vegaphobia
 Speciesism

References

External links 
 



Living people
1964 births
Activists from Montreal
Atheist feminists
Bisexual feminists
Bisexual musicians
Canadian animal rights activists
Canadian anti-racism activists
Canadian atheism activists
Canadian feminists
Canadian folk singers
Canadian former Christians
Canadian nurses
Canadian people of German descent
Canadian people of Swiss descent
Canadian TikTokers
Canadian women folk guitarists
Canadian YouTubers
Canadian veganism activists
Commentary YouTubers
Concordia University alumni
Critics of religions
Canadian LGBT musicians
Canadian LGBT rights activists
LGBT TikTokers
LGBT YouTubers
Singers from Montreal
Teachers of English as a second or foreign language
YouTube controversies
YouTube channels launched in 2018
Canadian women singer-songwriters
Canadian women nurses